A pulse detonation engine (PDE) is a type of propulsion system that uses detonation waves to combust the fuel and oxidizer mixture. The engine is pulsed because the mixture must be renewed in the combustion chamber between each detonation wave and the next.  Theoretically, a PDE can operate from subsonic up to a hypersonic flight speed of roughly Mach 5. An ideal PDE design can have a thermodynamic efficiency higher than other designs like turbojets and turbofans because a detonation wave rapidly compresses the mixture and adds heat at constant volume. Consequently, moving parts like compressor spools are not necessarily required in the engine, which could significantly reduce overall weight and cost.  PDEs have been considered for propulsion since 1940.  Key issues for further development include fast and efficient mixing of the fuel and oxidizer, the prevention of autoignition, and integration with an inlet and nozzle.

To date, no practical PDE has been put into production, but several testbed engines have been built and one was successfully integrated into a low-speed demonstration aircraft that flew in sustained PDE powered flight in 2008.  In June 2008, the Defense Advanced Research Projects Agency (DARPA) unveiled Blackswift, which was intended to use this technology to reach speeds of up to Mach 6. However the project was reported cancelled soon afterward, in October 2008.

Concept

Pulse jets

The basic operation of the PDE is similar to that of the pulse jet engine. In the pulse jet, air is mixed with fuel to create a flammable mixture that is then ignited in an open chamber. The resulting combustion greatly increases the pressure of the mixture to approximately 100 atmospheres (10 MPa), which then expands through a nozzle for thrust.

To ensure that the mixture exits to the rear, thereby pushing the aircraft forward, a series of shutters are used to close off the front of the engine. Careful tuning of the inlet ensures the shutters close at the right time to force the air to travel in one direction only through the engine. Some pulse jet designs used a tuned resonant cavity to provide the valving action through the airflow in the system. These designs normally look like a U-shaped tube, open at both ends.

In either system, the pulse jet has problems during the combustion process. As the fuel burns and expands to create thrust, it is also pushing any remaining unburnt charge rearward, out of the nozzle. In many cases some of the charge is ejected before burning, which causes the famous trail of flame seen on the V-1 flying bomb and other pulse jets. Even while inside the engine, the mixture's volume is constantly changing which inefficiently converts fuel into usable energy.

PDEs
All regular jet engines and most rocket engines operate on the deflagration of fuel, that is, the rapid but subsonic combustion of fuel. The pulse detonation engine is a concept currently in active development to create a jet engine that operates on the supersonic detonation of fuel. Because the combustion takes place so rapidly, the charge (fuel/air mix) does not have time to expand during this process, so it takes place under almost constant volume. Constant volume combustion is more efficient than open-cycle designs like gas turbines, which leads to greater fuel efficiency.

As the combustion process is so rapid, mechanical shutters are difficult to arrange with the required performance. Instead, PDEs generally use a series of valves to time the process carefully. In some PDE designs from General Electric, the shutters are eliminated through careful timing, using the pressure differences between the different areas of the engine to ensure the "shot" is ejected rearward.

Another side effect, not yet demonstrated in practical use, is the cycle time. A traditional pulsejet tops out at about 250 pulses per second due to the cycle time of the mechanical shutters, but the aim of the PDE is thousands of pulses per second, so fast that it is basically continuous from an engineering perspective. This should help smooth out the otherwise highly vibrational pulsejet engine — many small pulses will create less volume than a smaller number of larger pulses for the same net thrust. Unfortunately, detonations are many times louder than deflagrations.

The major difficulty with a pulse-detonation engine is starting the detonation.  While it is possible to start a detonation directly with a large spark, the amount of energy input is very large and is not practical for an engine. The typical solution is to use a deflagration-to-detonation transition (DDT)—that is, start a high-energy deflagration, and have it accelerate down a tube to the point where it becomes fast enough to become a detonation. Alternatively the detonation can be sent around a circle and valves ensure that only the highest peak power can leak into exhaust.  Also the pulse compression detonation system can be applied to solve  the initiation problem.

This process is far more complicated than it sounds, due to the resistance the advancing wavefront encounters (similar to wave drag).  DDTs occur far more readily if there are obstacles in the tube. The most widely used is the "Shchelkin spiral", which is designed to create the most useful eddies with the least resistance to the moving fuel/air/exhaust mixture. The eddies lead to the flame separating into multiple fronts, some of which go backwards and collide with other fronts, and then accelerate into fronts ahead of them.

The behavior is difficult to model and to predict, and research is ongoing. As with conventional pulsejets, there are two main types of designs: valved and valveless. Designs with valves encounter the same difficult-to-resolve wear issues encountered with their pulsejet equivalents. Valveless designs typically rely on abnormalities in the air flow to ensure a one-way flow, and are very hard to achieve in a regular DDT.

NASA maintains a research program on the PDE, which is aimed at high-speed, about Mach 5, civilian transport systems. However most PDE research is military in nature, as the engine could be used to develop a new generation of high-speed, long-range reconnaissance aircraft that would fly high enough to be out of range of any current anti-aircraft defenses, while offering range considerably greater than the SR-71, which required a massive tanker support fleet to use in operation.

While most research is on the high speed regime, newer designs with much higher pulse rates in the hundreds of thousands appear to work well even at subsonic speeds. Whereas traditional engine designs always include tradeoffs that limit them to a "best speed" range, the PDE appears to outperform them at all speeds. Both Pratt & Whitney and General Electric now have active PDE research programs in an attempt to commercialize the designs.

Key difficulties in pulse detonation engines are achieving DDT without requiring a tube long enough to make it impractical and drag-imposing on the aircraft (adding a U-bend into the tube extinguishes the detonation wave); reducing the noise (often described as sounding like a jackhammer); and damping the severe vibration caused by the operation of the engine.

First PDE powered flight

The first known flight of an aircraft powered by a pulse detonation engine took place at the Mojave Air & Space Port on 31 January 2008.  The project was developed by the Air Force Research Laboratory and Innovative Scientific Solutions, Inc.  The aircraft selected for the flight was a heavily modified Scaled Composites Long-EZ, named Borealis.  The engine consisted of four tubes producing pulse detonations at a frequency of 80 Hz, creating up to 200 pounds of thrust (890 newtons).  Many fuels were considered and tested by the engine developers in recent years, but a refined octane was used for this flight.  A small rocket system was used to facilitate the liftoff of the Long-EZ, but the PDE operated under its own power for 10 seconds at an altitude of approximately 100 feet (30 m).  The flight took place at a low speed whereas the appeal of the PDE engine concept lies more at high speeds, but the demonstration showed that a PDE can be integrated into an aircraft frame without experiencing structural problems from the 195-200 dB detonation waves.  No more flights are planned for the modified Long-EZ, but the success is likely to fuel more funding for PDE research. The aircraft itself has been moved to the National Museum of the United States Air Force for display.

In rocketry
If both fuel and oxidizer are carried by the vehicle a pulse detonation engine is independent of the atmosphere and it can be used in spaceflight. On 26 July 2021 (UTC), Japan's space agency JAXA successfully tested a pulse detonation rocket engine in space on a S-520 sounding rocket flight.

Popular culture

 In the sci-fi novel Aelita (1923), two Russians travel to Mars in a pulse detonation rocket utilizing "a fine powder of unusual explosive force" (p. 19).
The 1939 Soviet novel The Mystery of the Two Oceans by Grigory Adamov is centered around a submarine using a detonation engine (among other cutting-edge technologies). The fuel is a hydrogen/oxygen mixture, produced through water electrolysis. At one point, the submarine is sabotaged by disabling the pressure indicators, causing a buildup of the explosive mixture.
 X-COM: UFO Defense video game features fictional fighter aircraft, "Interceptor", which is powered by dual pulse detonation engines, according to ingame description.
 In the drama television series JAG, the Season Nine episode "The One That Got Away" (original air date 17 October 2003) features the Aurora — which in the show is a super-secret hypersonic aircraft under development by the CIA that uses a pulse-detonation engine.
In the movie Stealth (2005), the advanced fighters use pulse-detonation engines with scramjet boosters.
 The PDE has been used as a story point in a number of modern novels such as Dan Brown's thriller Deception Point (the second page of the book states that all technologies in the story are non-fictional and exist, albeit without referencing any sources), and Victor Koman's science fiction novel Kings of the High Frontier.
 Eureka season 4's Christmas special: Taggart creates a Santa sled powered by a pulse detonation engine.

See also
Nuclear pulse propulsion
Rotating detonation engine
Scramjet
Gluhareff Pressure Jet
List of pulsejet-powered aircraft
Aurora

References

External links
Innovative Scientific Solutions Inc.
Pulse Detonation Engines
Popular Science
1952 Pulse Detonation Jet Propulsion Patent by William Bollay
Apparatus powered using laser-supplied energy, US patent Issued on 6 August 1996 Boyd B. Bushman
(Video) The high detonation temperature inside the tube of an experimental PDE causes the seals to heat up and catch fire.
(Video) An experimental PDE operating with a detonation frequency of 1 Hz where the pulses are clearly defined.
(Video) An experimental PDE operating with a detonation frequency of 25 Hz.
2-D pulse-detonation engine simulation
Fox News report on the Blackswift
DARPA May 2009 notes on PDE

Jet engines
Aircraft engines
Emerging technologies